Radomir "Roy" Jokanovich (October 27, 1934 – August 6, 2007) was an offensive tackle and offensive guard in the Canadian Football League for the Toronto Argonauts and Calgary Stampeders from 1960 to 1964.

Biography
He was born as Radomir Jokanovich on October 27, 1934 to Serb father Miloš and Slovene mother Christine "Katerina" Jokanovich (née Matjašec).

After playing college football at the University of British Columbia, Roy Jokanovich joined the Toronto Argonauts in 1960. Jokanovich was traded to the Calgary Stampeders in 1962 and stayed with them until 1964. During that 3-year stretch, the Stampeders led the league in scoring in 1964  and 1963 and was second in 1962. A durable player, he never participated in fewer than 13 games in any year.

Jokanovich attended the Saint Michael the Archangel Serbian Orthodox Church in Vancouver.

Jokanovich passed away on August 6, 2007 in Vancouver. He is interred at Forest Lawn Memorial Park in Burnaby.

References

Players of Canadian football from Alberta
1934 births
2007 deaths
Toronto Argonauts players
Calgary Stampeders players
University of British Columbia alumni
UBC Thunderbirds football players
Canadian football offensive linemen
Canadian people of Serbian descent
Canadian people of Slovenian descent
Burials in British Columbia